is a Japanese manga series written and illustrated by Etorouji Shiono. It was serialized in the semi-monthly seinen manga magazine Young Gangan from December 2004 to 2009, when it was transferred to Monthly Big Gangan where it continued until its end in March 2019. Its 170 chapters were collected into 24 tankōbon volumes by Square Enix. The story of Übel Blatt takes place in a medieval, fantasy-like landscape. It follows the steps of Koinzell, who appears to be nothing more than a mere half-human child most distinguishable for the scar over his left eye. He is on a quest of revenge against those who betrayed and killed him and now call themselves the seven heroes of the land.

A side-story called Übel Blatt Gaiden was published in Young Gangan Big on August 25, 2011. Yen Press began releasing Übel Blatt in North America in October 2014. The series has also been translated into French, where it has ranked amongst the country's best-selling manga.

Plot
Beginning some twenty years prior to the start of the manga, the story narrates on how Koinzell, then named Ascheriit, was a young, prodigious swordsman whose skill granted him the fabled title of Blatt Meister (literally "Blade Master"). His deeds made him one of the fourteen chosen by the ruling emperor of the Empire of Szaalenden to venture into a dangerous quest to defeat a powerful enemy invader known as the evil nation of Wischtech, of whom the many powerful engines of destruction and dark sorcery made a dangerous foe. Each armed with a lance blessed by the Emperor himself, and thus known as the Fourteen Lances, the chosen traveled far into the enemy's wasted landscape, losing three of their ranks to the perils of the land, until they arrived into a forest where seven of the eleven remaining decided to forfeit their mission, fearing for their lives. Nevertheless, Ascheriit and three of those still bent on following the Emperor's will continued, and incredibly succeeded in their deed, returning victorious. It was then that the seven who abandoned the mission ambushed their comrades and massacred them. On returning home, they told the Emperor that the four they killed turned traitors against them, and after dispatching them the seven completed the task. Thus, they were hailed as heroes and dubbed the Seven Heroes, while the four who were killed became symbols of treachery and received the moniker of Lances of Betrayal.

Thus, the story tells of the voyage of Ascheriit, who indeed survived the slaughter and vowed to take the head of his traitorous companions, now powerful nobles and warlords hailed as saviors by the people.

Characters

Main characters

 Koinzell is a new name taken by one of the falsely-labeled Lances of Betrayal, Ascheriit. Back in his youth he was an orphan who was found as baby by a swordsmith who adopted him. As he grow he worked as swordsmith until he was accepted as a student in Ms. Glea's school of swordsmanship where he accomplished such feats including almost learning of the infamous Black Wing sword technique after seeing the swords forms only once on his first day there. Showing such promise made him the new heir of the title of Blade Master, an ancient honor for those deemed true master swordsmen. He then became one of the fourteen youths chosen to carry the Emperor's spears and end the war with Wischtech, and was also one of the four to accomplish their mission only to be betrayed and brutally murdered by their fellow companions, those who became known as the Seven Heroes. After having his left eye gouged out by Glenn, his best friend, and his body minced to pieces, he was left for dead but managed to survive by feeding on a fairy, which regenerated him at the expense of mixing his human blood with that of the faeries, thus giving him the appearance of a human-fairy child hybrid with feminine facial features, pale hair, skin and red eyes. Koinzell is regarded as one of the best fighters in the series, and considered the strongest swordsman in the history of the empire, due to not only to his swordsmanship, which include the fabled Black Wing, but also because he can create massive black chain-swords from his right wrist. He is shown to be usually cold, ruthless, and even brutal when hunting down those who betrayed him. He can however be very caring and often puts himself at great risk or harm for others for who considers friends of those who he believes is just in their cause or act. That is due to that although revenge motivates him, he is still the hero which he was before being betrayed by his friends. He is eventually exonerated after Glenn's betrayal and is made a Count of the Empire. He is empowered by the twin moons of the world, and if too fatigued he shrinks into an emaciated child fairy until recovered.

 The third princess of the Kusharundo clan, she is a young human girl who dresses as a man so as to fight on the front-line with her brother Klato, whom she looks up to. After the latter's death at the hands of Koinzell when Klato's mind and body was altered by the Fake Güsstav and becoming a hideous monstrosity, Ato vowed to avenge him by taking Koinzell's life, though she always failed due to her inferior skills with the sword. In time, she accepted that what Koinzell had done was an act of mercy, and came to respect him greatly, striving to get his acceptance and approval, though in doing so she put herself into perilous situations due to excessive recklessness. In one such occasion Ato was mortally wounded and, shocked by how much she truly cared for him, Koinzell saved her by giving her his blood, which healed her and turned her into a human-fairy hybrid, however she lacks Koinzell's elf-like ears. Currently she is traveling with him in his quest for revenge.

 A young elven girl and the only survivor of the village Miruel-Mirael, which was laid to waste. She tried in vain to pass the frontiers that divided the Empire from the bordering countries by smuggling herself, but was captured and almost put to death until Koinzell showed up and, to save her without bloodshed, addressed her as Peepi and claimed to be her brother. Since then, Peepi has been how the girl was referred, and her real name is not yet known. Being so young she is prone to cry, but she also has considerable inner strength and also showed talent in summoning magic due to her elven heritage.

 A giant man with a menacing look who is actually a kind person. He was a captain in Schtemwölech's White Wing Army whose leader is a young man named Pago who Gerapen calls "brother". A kind yet easily fooled man, he unknowingly helps Pago gather young women refugees who are used in Schtemwölech experiments under the belief he is helping relocate them to a new village. But when he finds undead monsters created by Pago, Gerapen is horrified and at first refuse to believe Pago is responsible, but when he sees Pago's disturbing acts for himself, Gerapen realize Pago tricked him all along and assists Koinzell  to end his "brother's" life. He was thought to have died after Schtemwölech secret lair was destroyed but he reunites with the protagonists at Jullas-Abllas where it is revealed he survived thanks to the parasite from Pago's body. He later becomes one of the main fighters of the group as he uses tentacle arms provided by the parasite, though he sometimes exhibits feminine responses at random times possibly due to how the victims of the parasite were all girls before it latched onto Geranpen.

The Fourteen Lances

The Three Who Were Slain

The three Lances who died on the journey to defeat Wischtech. So far, only one of them has been named.

 Elgunaha is a close friend of Koinzell, having met him while trying to convince the previous blade master to join the war effort. He is the first of the fourteen Lances to be sacrificed.  He cast a spell that creates a gigantic wall separating part of the world from the other, but the spell has an unintentional effect of turning the caster into stone. The wall, called the "Heaven's Lance" is eventually destroyed by Koinzell, after making his final peace with Elgunaha.

The Seven Heroes

The Seven heroes who supposedly defeated Wischtech during the war twenty years ago. However, the truth is that they were too cowardly to continue on through the forest of death. After the four so-called "Lances of Betrayal" entered Wischtech and completed their quest, the Seven Heroes ambushed them and slaughtered them. They then returned to the kingdom and claimed credit for the deeds of the Four, and stained the names of those same Four with the title of "Lances of Betrayal". Following Glenn's resurrection and public revolt against the Empire, the truth is made known to the public and the Seven Heroes are vilified for their actions.

 One of the Fourteen Lances that massacred Ascheriit and his three companions and returned as heroes, thus becoming one of the fabled Seven Heroes. A mere stonemason turned thief before being chosen as one of the Fourteen Lances, he was good friends with Ascheriit who he claims inspired him to join the mission (as Ascheriit also came from humble beginnings). But after becoming a lord he became obsessed with all the power and rewards he received as a "hero" and desired to have them forever. He sought to live forever by use of Wischtech sorcery and medical experiments. He had hundreds of women with fairy blood drained and minced so as to keep his body from aging. In his quest for immortality, he tried to use Köinzell due to his human-fairy nature. But his callous attitude after realizing who Koinzell was caused Koinzell to go berserk and mutate into a more powerful winged form. He was then beaten and massacred while begging for mercy. He was the first of the "Heroes" to fall.

 A member of Fourteen Lances who betrayed Ascheriit. Before he was sent to the Emperor as one of the Lances, he was the son of a powerful merchant, the youngest of three brothers. Insecure and inept in dealing with business, he was instead chosen as an envoy to the Emperor due to his considerable physical prowess. He was a friend of Ascheriit, and one of the few members of the 7 Heroes to understand what the brutality of their acts would bring upon them all. After becoming a hero, he appears to have been corrupted, possibly by his guilt, and he started living lavishly, consumed by anger and envy against Glenn for not being granted constructions of war airships, and secretly turned his fortress into a flying castle armed with Wischtech engines of destruction. After Schtemwolech's death he grew increasingly paranoid and fearful that even the slightest thing could be an attempt to his life. So paranoid he was, he sends his army to attack the city of Jullas-Abllas, accusing its citizens of supporting Koinzell. Ironically, his actions actually made the citizens support Koinzell and fight against his army. In the end, his own men betrayed him and left him, a fact that finally drove him completely insane. When Koinzell caught up, Barestar believed they were back in the war at a point where Koinzell had saved him. He sadly asked Koinzell to help him get back to his home and his family. Seeing such a thing, Koinzell killed him while in his stupor, as an act of pity. Barestar is currently the only one of the Seven Heroes that Ascheriit shows slight remorse for killing.

 One of the most prominent of the Seven Heroes, the mastermind of the betrayal of the Four Lances, and the primary antagonist of the series. Glenn is the son of the Emperor. He was nominated as envoy of the Emperor himself to deal with the increasingly threatening acts of Koinzell. In the days of the Fourteen Lances they were good friends, yet Glenn secretly despised and envied Ascheriit greatly due to his superior swordsmanship and his calm behavior. He recognized the brutality of their treason and did not fear eventual retribution, and he also believed that their punishment was the very fact that they became heroes, being burdened with the welfare of the whole Empire not only as nobles, but as symbols for the people. In his first encounter with Koinzell, he publicly spared Koinzell's life, but he was killed outright by Koinzell during their second encounter. After Glenn's death, his father, the emperor, became so depressed that he no longer took interest in his empire. As a result, Lebelont became the de facto ruler of the Szaalenden. Somehow Glenn was then resurrected, bearing a younger body and the scar from where Koinzell slashed him. He speaks of a mysterious plan to combat the weakness of people's hearts and attempts to destroy Lebelont. He has dismissed his knight company and renounced the title he had gained as one of the seven heroes. While fighting Köinzell and his father, Glenn reveals that before his death, he had a Wischtech parasite implanted in his body that would, upon his death, devour his corpse and take on his memories and personality, essentially restoring him to life.

 An ambitious and powerful "hero" of the empire. During the time of the 14 Holy Lances, Lebelont was the most fearful of the Forest of Death. He could not keep calm at the night of their stay in the Forest of Death, claiming that there was nothing that 11 of the remaining Holy Lances could do, and that they should just give up. He inspired fear in the other "7 Heroes", prompting Glenn to abandon their quest. Lebelont managed to effectively usurp the throne through various powerplays after Glenn's death and was now the unofficial ruler of the empire due to his position as head of its armed forces. He was a ruthless and cunning man. He recently declared war on the Wischtech after publicly executing ten of their kind. He had five children by an unknown mother, each as brutal as their father. But his will started to deteriorate after Koinzell killed his youngest son. Attacks by a resurrected Glenn have caused him to deteriorate faster in both body and mind. He has since been reduced to a psychotic tyrant who has apparently been raping women so as to extend his family line. He eventually goes insane when his children (some of which had joined with Glenn) began to fight and he realized his ambitions had been destroyed. He is confronted by Koinzell in his winged form and, after realizing his true identity, is torn apart by Koinzell's wings.

 The Dragon Chief of the empire. His ideas agree with Glenn's, and he tries to use his power as a hero to make the empire a better place. Due to Lebelont recent actions, including the massacre of Jebr and reigniting the war with the Wischtech, Ischüdien forms an alliance with Order of the Seven Lances, as he sees Lebelont's acts as having gone too far, and may destroy the empire. Ischüdien is unique among the 7 Heroes, as his motivation for giving up the quest of the 14 Lances does not appear to be driven from fear of the Forest of Death, judging from his expressions during the incident. While most of the heroes try to see themselves as equal, he appears to see Glenn as his master.

 Almost nothing is known about Güllengurv currently, except that he is in charge of the castle which the priestess who reads the moons and stars resides. He is the fattest of the 7 Heroes. He and Nirgenfeled are almost always seen together. He has his throat slashed by Koinzell while he and Nirgenfeled hid in the armory of Lebelont's castle.

 Little is known about Nirgenfeled, but in all of his appearances as an old man he has held a look of worry on his face. He rarely speaks. In a moment of irony, he claimed that "If Ascheriit was alive, he would kill the rebel (Koinzell) in the blink of an eye." He is beheaded by Koinzell while hiding in Lebelont's armory.

The Traitorous Lances

The Four Lances who apparently betrayed the Empire to Wisstech. The truth was that they were the ones who actually completed the quest while the Seven 'Heroes' ambushed and murdered them, and afterwards stole credit for their accomplishments. After Glenn betrays the Empire, however, the truth is revealed and the Four Lances are exonerated and given the recognition they deserve.

A man with great pride and honor.  Kfer maintains a calm manner and puts his duty before anything else.  He was the heir of the Jebnaress clan, the ruling clan of Jebr.  Jebnaress had a history of strong swordsmanship, but Kfer lost the title of "Strongest in the Empire" to Ascheriit (Koinzell).  Unlike Glenn, he held no jealousy nor hatred towards Ascheriit and became his friend and requested Ascheriit to train his son to become the strongest swordsman in the next generation. During the war, Glenn attempted to convince Kfer to follow him and the other 6 members of the Holy Lances to give up on their mission because, as an important noble, he has an important lineage to keep. Kfer angrily refuses to betray Ascheriit, Güsstav and Krentel on their mission and cursed Glenn and the others' cowardice. After the betrayal of the 7 heroes, Kfer was killed, and, as Kfer was framed as a traitor, Jebnaress was disgraced, and was overthrown by the other clans of Jebr.  Kfer's son, Ikfes, became a slave knight and hated having the blood of his father, whom he thought betrayed the empire.

Little is known about Güsstav, but according to Kfer, she has "more experience in war than anyone". Lebelont said that Gustav was born in a stranded area, and was not a noble.

Little is known about Krentel, but according to Kfer, he (assumed as male) has "supreme knowledge of magic". Lebelont said that Krentel was born in a stranded area, and was not a noble.

Szaalenden Empire

The current reigning Emperor. Largor was a strong leader who has made the Szaalenden empire prosper since the Wischtech war. After the death of his son, Glenn, he lost all interest in governing the empire. As a result, Lebelont used this to his advantage, becoming the de facto ruler of the empire. The Imperial Elector's have decided to elect a new Emperor to replace Largor. He eventually comes out of his stupor and assists Koinzell in his battle against the revived Glenn, who the Emperor disowns after discovering that he had dabbled in the dark magic of Wischtech. He then apologizes to Koinzell and exonerates him and his comrades before dying of his wounds. The Emperor has magnificent skill with a sword, claimed to equal that of a Blade Master, in spite of his advanced age.

 Son of Kfer and slave knight serving under Glenn, his swordsmanship is almost on the same level as Koinzell, thought Ms. Gleaa stated that he is more skilled than Ascheriit who is in fact Koinzell. He's been studying under Ms. Gleaa for 5 years and was told if he killed the Hero Slayer, he'd regain his title as Imperial Royalty. He has a little brother. He is the empire's most skilled swordsman and is said to be the next to inherit the title 'Blatt Meister' after Ascheriit. Ikfes confronts Koinzell after he slays Barestar and the two engage in a brutal sword fight. Ikfes acknowledges Koinzell's skill with a sword but still believes his skill is superior. The battle ends however, when Koinzell uses the 'Black Wings' technique, the ultimate skill only a 'Blatt Meister' would know, to shatter Ikfes' sword and injure his arm. His defeat causes Ikfes to become more obsessed with defeating Koinzell. It has been revealed that Ikfes is related to one of the Four Lances of Betrayal, which is how he lost his status as imperial royalty. He was given Ascheriit's Fairy Stone Sword by Glenn, which he presumably stole from Asceriit after betraying and murdering him. At the end of their second duel Koinzell once again uses the Black Wings and injures Ikfes in doing so. Ikfes blames Kfer's, revealed to be his father and is Koinzell's friend, sword technique which he acquired as the reason for his losses. Koinzell tells Ikfes that Kfer's technique was incorporated into the Black Wings, the Blatt Meister's technique, and that he should not be ashamed of his heritage. Ikfes then uses the technique on Koinzell to defeat him, but does not kill him, saying instead that he still wants to learn things from Koinzell. However, as Ikfes reaches out to Koinzell to pull him to his feet, Lebelond uses his flying castle's main cannon to blast Koinzell. After the massacre of Jebr, Ikfes is hailed as a hero and becomes the newest 'Blatt Meister', thus repairing "The Mansion of Swords" name. He then thrust into Lebelont's war effort. But he is now very conflicted with his actions, and wonders if he is following the sword of justice as his mother had hoped. Koinzell admit that Ikfes is one of few people whom he fears their sword. After the truth is revealed about his father, Ikfes tries to force Koinzell into a duel to the death in hopes that Koinzell will kill him for having served the men who killed his parents, but Koinzell ultimately defeats him mentally and forces him to stand down.

 A swordsmanship teacher at "The Mansion of Swords", she's spent 20 years rebuilding the reputation of the school after Ascheriit was labeled a traitor. She taught Ascheriit and hates Glenn for killing him. Glenn has told her of his murder of Ascheriit and the other Lances of Betrayal, but he does not reveal the truth of what transpired. instead he tells her that the four of them went to negotiate with the enemy and the seven heroes were young, full of themselves and thus believed that the four tried to betray the empire, claiming he murdered them for the empire. She wished that they could have at least preserved their names as heroes rather than calling them the "Lances of Betrayal". Glenn reappears to her after his revival and tries to tempt her with eternal youth in order to get her to train his soldiers, but she refuses. When she discovers that Ascheriit is still alive (as Koinzell) she is overjoyed, though she has him reenroll at the Mansion for a time after she notices his faltering sword skills, making a point that, hero or not, Ascheriit is still one of her students.

Order of the Seven Lances

 Rozen is an officer of the Order of the Seven Lances, the personal unit of Glenn. He and his retinues help Koinzell, until learning of his true nature. Rozen overheard Koinzell's secret, that he is Asceriit and the Lances of Betrayal are the true heroes. However, Rozen does not agree with Koinzell's mission of vengeance because he believes that no matter if the seven heroes truly were betrayers the empire's stability is built around the "Seven Heroes". Originally, he wished to kill Koinzell so that he (Koinzell) would die as the "Hero of the Plains" rather than as a rebel, but has since realized that nothing will stop Koinzell's revenge. He is often conflicted because he has heard the true story about the supposed Seven Heroes and Lances of Betrayal and will often begin to cry when he sees Koinzell fighting.

 Rozen's attendant. A young woman with glasses, she is extremely skilled with the crossbow and specializes in delivering bolts with explosive arrowheads.

 The daughter of the imperial elector Aleczalt Rahnclave and a knight of the Seven Lances. She first meets the main character, Koinzell, at the town of Jullas Abllas. It is also there that her view of the once traitor and enemy to the empire changes into something more. The Rhanclave family is one of the ten families that have the power to elect a succeeding emperor. It is also said that the Rhanclave family is over 1000 years old and specializes in fighting. She also has a strong sense of justice as her reason for joining the Seven Lances was only to protect the people and the empire.

 A knight of the Seven Lances who follows Elseria. This knight specializes in the use of chains or ropes(wires) to inflict damage or capture his enemies. So far, not much is known about this character.

Others
The Besiegers
A group led by a former admirers of the "Hero Killer". Promised to return and integrate his army by the "Traitorous Lance", he has served the royalty as "The Unbeatable". However, since recent chapters (Chapter 100+), he has turned and recognizes his "savior"'s new form.

 A smuggler and acquaintance of Altea, he initially showed up to help Peepi and Koinzell as they were questioned, and escaped with them to the Empire after the destruction of the border fortress Heaven's Lance.  After saving princess Sharen of the Kusharundo clan, from one of the Seven Heroes, Schtemwolech, he decided not to follow Koinzell.  However he promised to help Koinzell one day when the need arises.

 A smuggler of Heaven's Lance and owner of an underground tavern, so she is close friends with Vid and took an instant liking to Koinzell after he was introduced to her, perhaps because he has the same eyes as her presumably deceased lover.  After the warrior monks in control of Heaven's Lance's temple raided the tavern (and interrupted their fun, but manage to have sex with him at the end of ch 20), martial law was declared after Koinzell dispatched a whole group of monks with a fallen ceiling support beam.  Altea decided to smuggle Koinzell, Vid and Peepi through the gate using the old Wischtech tunnel that she had discovered along with her lover.  During the fight with the Wischtech monster that had killed her lover, Altea was able to work through her trauma of seeing her lover killed and managed save Peepi.  After the incident with Schtemwolech (which she did not take part of), Ato, Peepi and her decided to follow Koinzell in his journey, but they lost their trail at the city of Jullas Abllas.  They were briefly reunited after Ato was injured during the fight between Koinzell and Elsaria.  During the chaos surrounding Barestar's siege of Jullas Abllas, and unable to stand the lives she had saved (through smuggling) getting killed for pointless reasons, she took charge of the situation and organized the combined forces of Vigilance Committee (sort of like Jullas Abllas' police force) and armed civilians into an effective defence force, saving many lives.  They decided to nominate Altea as their leader after the siege was halted by Barestar's death in Koinzell's hands.  Altea decided to stay and protect the Free City of Jullas Abllas that Koinzell tried so hard to save, perhaps intending it as his legacy or as a testament to his honour and his will to protect the empire.

The Black Wing Army
A rebel army in the frontier borderlands near Wischtech, the army is led by four former landlords who were veterans of the Wischtech war who lost their lands after defending it from rival warlords but were accused of the starting the border disputes. Embittered, the former landlords regroup their armies with Wischtech magic and weapons and took the names of the Four Lances of Betrayal to gain support. Under their tyrannical rule, the Black Wing army, pillage, slaughter and raped any civilians and Empire loyalists they found. But their reign ended after Koinzell defeated them.

Fake Kfer is a massive brute who merely loves killing and raping women without any feeling for others.  He attacks without concern even with his own troops. He wields a massive mace and rides an equally large horse whom he loves more than anything else. Both he and his horse were killed by Koinzell.

A large woman and cruel magic user who likes to see men running in fear and dying horribly. A narcissist, she likes young, beautiful boys and brainwashes them and performs cruel and morbid surgeries by adding animals parts on them, with one of the victims being Ato's brother Klato. Like the Fake Kfer, the Fake Güsstav does not care about her troops and even kills them personally if they try to kill a pretty boy she fancies. When she first encounters Koinzell, she wants to make him one of her toys which prompts her to rape him but Koinzell uses that to his advantage to escape his constraints and in the process cuts her face. Enraged, she transforms using Wischtech magic into a hideous beast but is killed by Koinzell.

A conniving short man, he used Wischtech magic to turn the frontier Count of the borderlands into a monster to attack Koinzell and the Order of the Seven Lances. He was however killed by his own monster when he lost control of it.

A tall man with long hair, he uses twin blades and two obsidian swords implanted within his back, which he claims is the Black Wing. When Koinzell reveals who he really is, he tries to save himself by offering the Black Wing Army to use in his revenge, only for Koinzell to kill him for using and further staining his fallen comrades names. His last words were a sad questioning of why it took Koinzell so long to return, as they wouldn't have had to do what they did if he had been there.

Release

Written and illustrated by Etorouji Shiono, Übel Blatt began being serialized in the semi-monthly Young Gangan in December 2004. It returned from a two-year hiatus on December 24, 2011. The manga finished on March 25, 2019. Publisher Square Enix collected the chapters into 24 tankōbon volumes, beginning with volume 0 on July 25, 2005 and ending with volume 23 on June 25, 2019.

A side-story called Übel Blatt Gaiden was published in Young Gangan Big on August 25, 2011. In February 2014, Yen Press announced they had licensed Übel Blatt for English release in North America. They publish the series in omnibus format of two volumes in one, with volume 0 (Japanese volumes 0 and 1) released in October 2014. The manga is published in France by Ki-oon, who released the first volume 0 on May 24, 2007.

Reception
The series' twelfth collected volume sold 29,167 copies in its debut week, the thirteenth sold 28,574, and the seventeenth 22,358 copies.

Rebecca Silverman of Anime News Network gave the first English-language omnibus a B rating, praising its revenge story. She saw similarities between Koinzell's past and The Count of Monte Cristo and stated that its supporting cast brings themes of racial inequality and political corruption. However, Silverman noted several "uncomfortable sexual moments," including rape, and called the backgrounds generic.

In France, Übel Blatt has made it into the top 15 weekly list for best-selling manga at number 11. It was awarded the Japan Expo Award 2008 in the seinen category.

References

External links
 Square Enix Official Website  
 Yen Press Official Website
 

Dark fantasy anime and manga
Gangan Comics manga
Anime and manga about revenge
Seinen manga
Yen Press titles